The klezmer violinist and bandleader Abe Schwartz recorded prolifically in the 1910s and 1920s.

Singles & EPs 

This section presents some Phonograph recordings of Abe Schwartz's Orchestra between from 1919 until 1946.

Discographies of American artists
Klezmer albums